The 2018 ITTF World Tour Grand Finals was the final competition of the 2018 ITTF World Tour, the International Table Tennis Federation's professional table tennis world tour. It was the 23rd edition of the competition, and was held from 13–16 December in Incheon, South Korea.

The competition featured events in five categories: men's singles, women's singles, men's doubles, women's doubles and mixed doubles.

Events

Qualification

Players earned points based on their performances in the singles and doubles tournaments at the 12 events of the 2018 ITTF World Tour. The top 16 men's and women's singles players, and the top eight men's, women's and mixed doubles pairs who satisfied the qualification criteria were invited to compete. China's Ma Long qualified for the men's singles event, but withdrew due to injury. His place was taken by Japan's Yuya Oshima.

Tournament format

The singles and doubles tournaments consisted of knockout draws, with 16 players starting each of the singles events and eight pairs starting each of the doubles events. The seedings for the tournament draws were based on final tour standings, not the official ITTF world ranking.

Men's singles

Players

Draw

Women's singles

Players

Draw

Men's doubles

Players

Draw

Women's doubles

Players

Draw

Mixed doubles

Players

Draw

ITTF Star Awards

The 2018 ITTF Star Awards ceremony was held at the Grand Hyatt Hotel in Incheon on 12 December.

Awards were handed out in seven categories:

Male Table Tennis Star:  Fan Zhendong
Female Table Tennis Star:  Ding Ning
Male Para Table Tennis Star:  Jordi Morales
Female Para Table Tennis Star:  Kelly van Zon
Table Tennis Star Coach:  Massimo Costantini
Table Tennis Breakthrough Star:  Manika Batra
Table Tennis Star Point:  Xu Xin (versus Stefan Fegerl at the 2018 World Team Championships)

See also

2018 World Team Table Tennis Championships
2018 ITTF Team World Cup
2018 ITTF Men's World Cup
2018 ITTF Women's World Cup

References

External links
2018 ITTF World Tour Grand Finals
International Table Tennis Federation

2018
World Tour Grand Finals
ITTF World Tour Grand Finals
Table tennis competitions in South Korea
International sports competitions hosted by South Korea
Sports competitions in Incheon
ITTF World Tour Grand Finals